Raúl Alexánder Tito Cano (born 5 September 1997) is a Peruvian professional footballer who plays as a winger for Peruvian club Deportivo Garcilaso.

Club career

Sport Boys
Tito joined the academy of Peruvian Primera División side Sport Boys in 2010 at age 12, and signed for the first team in 2014. On 15 May 2014, he made his professional debut for Sport Boys in the Peruvian Segunda División in a 1–1 draw against Carlos A. Mannucci. That season, he went on to make a total of eighteen league appearances, scoring three goals.

Cienciano
In early 2020, Tito signed with Primera División side Cienciano. That season, he made 24 league appearances, scoring four goals, and made another six appearances in the Copa Inca.

Universitario
In 2016, Tito signed with Universitario de Deportes. That season, he made sixteen appearances, scoring two goals. The following season, he made six appearances before going on loan to fellow Primera División side Real Garcilaso on 17 August 2017. There, Tito made eight appearances and scored one goal.

Sport Rosario
In 2018, Tito signed with Sport Rosario. On 20 February, he made his continental debut in the Copa Sudamericana First Stage against Uruguayan side Cerro. Tito started both legs against Cerro, as Sport Rosario lost the series 2–0 on aggregate. In league play, Tito made a career-high 32 appearances, scoring three goals. After contract renewal talks broke down, Tito left Sport Rosario at the end of the 2018 season.

Return to Cienciano
On 25 January 2019, Tito signed with Cienciano for the second time, now as part of an attempt to earn promotion back to the Primera División after being relegated in the 2018 season. Tito made ten appearances that season, scoring one goal, as Cienciano won the league and earned direct promotion back to the top flight.

FC Edmonton
On 19 February 2020, Tito signed with Canadian Premier League side FC Edmonton. After being unable to join his new club for the shortened 2020 season due to COVID-19 travel restrictions, Tito was loaned to Peruvian Segunda División side Santos in October 2020. He made his loan debut as a substitute in a 1–0 win over Cultural Santa Rosa on 27 October 2020. Tito finished his loan with one goal in eight appearances.

On 8 January 2021, Tito re-signed with Edmonton for the 2021 season. On 21 June 2021, Tito and the club agreed to a mutual termination of his contract after he was again unable to travel to Canada due to the COVID-19 pandemic.

International career
Tito represented Peru at the 2017 South American U-20 Championship, making a substitute appearance in a 2–0 loss to Bolivia and a start in a 2–0 loss to Uruguay.

Career statistics

Honours
Universitario
Peruvian Primera División: Apertura 2016

Cienciano
Peruvian Segunda División: 2019

References

External links

1997 births
Living people
Association football wingers
Peruvian footballers
Footballers from Lima
Sport Boys footballers
Cienciano footballers
Club Universitario de Deportes footballers
Real Garcilaso footballers
Sport Rosario footballers
FC Edmonton players
Santos de Nasca players
Peruvian Segunda División players
Peruvian Primera División players
Peru youth international footballers
Deportivo Garcilaso players